Douglas Allen may refer to:

 Douglas Allen, Baron Croham (1917–2011), British politician and civil servant
 Douglas Allen (illustrator) (1920)
 Douglas Allen (philosopher) (1941), American philosopher, academic, author and activist
 Douglas W. Allen (1960), Canadian economist

See also
 Doug Allen (disambiguation)